List of filming locations in the British Columbia Interior, arranged by location.

Ashcroft

 The Andromeda Strain (2008)
 An Unfinished Life (2005)

Barkerville

 Harry Tracy, Desperado
 Klondike Fever
 The Legend of Kootenai Brown (also known as Showdown at Williams Creek)

Cache Creek

 The Andromeda Strain (2008)

Fort Steele

 Snow Queen

Fraser Canyon

 The Grey Fox
 The Pledge

Hedley

 The Andromeda Strain (2008)

Hope

 First Blood (1982)

Kamloops

 The Andromeda Strain (2008)
 Battlestar Galactica
 Cadence
 Firewall
 An Unfinished Life

Kelowna

 Fido
 The Hillclimb
 The Legend of Simon Conjurer
 Mee-Shee: The Water Giant
 The Projectionist
 Say Yes & Marry Me
 The Scarecrow and The Rainbow Kid
 A Sister's Nightmare 
 Stolen Lives
 The Tattoo
 Time Runner, aka In Exile
 The Union: The Business Behind Getting High
 What Are You Anyways?
 WWF Smackdown

 X-Weighted
 The Recall
 Humanity Bureau
 Distorted
 Daughter of the Wolf
 The Last Victim

Lillooet

 Atomic Train
 La Menace
 The Pledge

Lytton

 The Pledge

Nelson

 Roxanne
 Housekeeping
 A Simple Curve
 The Tall Man

Pemberton
see  List of filming locations in the Vancouver area

Penticton

 My American Cousin

Prince George

 Double Jeopardy
 Dreamcatcher
 Reindeer Games
 Strange Brew

Princeton

 The Grey Fox
 The Pledge

Savona

 The Andromeda Strain (2008)

Stewart

 Baby This Is for You
 Bear Island
 Eight Below
 Iceman
 Insomnia
 The Thing

Summerland

 My American Cousin
 Time Runner

Thompson-Nicola Region

 The Andromeda Strain (2008)

Vernon

 Fido

See also
 List of filming locations in the Vancouver area
 Hollywood North

Notes

References
 Titles with locations including British Columbia, Canada from The Internet Movie Database

Interior of British Columbia
Cinema of British Columbia
British Columbia
Filming locations